Pickerington High School may refer to:

 Pickerington High School Central
 Pickerington High School North